Johannes Hendrikus Viljoen (15 October 1893 – 5 December 1957) was a South African politician, member of parliament for the constituencies of Hoopstad (1933-1941) and Vryburg (1948-1957), Minister of Mines (1950-1953), Education, Arts and Sciences (1950-1957), Social Affairs (1953-1954), Forestry (1954-1956) and Health (1956-1957) in both Dr Malan's and Advocate Strijdom's cabinets in South Africa.

Political career
Viljoen was the son of JH (Jan) Viljoen (1869-1955), a veteran of the Second Boer War and of his wife, Lenie Maré. JH Viljoen jr. was successively a member of the National Party, of the United Party (1934-1941), of the Afrikaner Party (1941-1943) then again of the National Party.

After defeating Theophilus Donges in the South African general election of 1938, J.H. Viljoen was a supporter of South Africa's neutrality at the outbreak of World War II and a staunch supporter of James Barry Munnik Hertzog.

Death
Aged 64, while a member of the Strijdom government, he died of a long illness on 5 December 1957 and was buried in Wesselsbron in the Orange Free State.

1893 births
1957 deaths
South African politicians